Guy Court is an American comedy court show television series and the third spin-off to Guy Code. The series premiered on November 6, 2013, and airs on MTV2. Guy Court handles a variety of cases where the "guy code" was violated. Donnell Rawlings serves as the "judge" with Melanie Iglesias as the "bailiff". Various cast members from Guy Code serve as lawyers.

Cast

 Donnell Rawlings
 Melanie Iglesias
 Andrew Schulz
 Anthony "Chico" Bean
 Charlamagne Tha God
 Chris Distefano
 Dan Soder
 Damien Lemon
 Jon Gabrus
 Jermaine Fowler
 Jordan Carlos

Episodes

References

External links
 

2010s American comedy television series
2013 American television series debuts
2013 American television series endings
2010s American reality television series
MTV2 original programming
English-language television shows
American television spin-offs
Court shows
Reality television spin-offs